Tapinoma minimum is a species of ant in the genus Tapinoma. Described by Gustav Mayr in 1895, the species is endemic to Tanzania.

References

Endemic fauna of Tanzania
Tapinoma
Hymenoptera of Africa
Insects described in 1895